La gloria de Lucho (English title: Big Steps) is a Colombian telenovela written by Juan Andrés Granados and produced by Sony Pictures Television and Teleset for Caracol Televisión, based on the life of ex-councilman Luis Eduardo Díaz. Its official premiere was on February 11, 2019 and stars Enrique Carriazo and Verónica Orozco. The show ended on June 7, 2019.

Plot 
The real-life story of Luis Eduardo Diaz, a controversial bootblack, who went from having nothing to having it all, after winning the elections for an important political position in his city.

Cast 
 Enrique Carriazo as Luis Eduardo "Lucho" Díaz Chaparro
 Verónica Orozco as Gloria Vargas de Díaz
 Juliana Velásquez as Leidy Díaz Vargas
 Laura Torres as Marcela Díaz Vargas
 Carlos Camacho as Rubén Alfonso Murcia
 Luis Eduardo Arango as Everardo Porras
 Andrea Guzmán as Graciela Blanco
 Edgardo Román as Gonzalo Díaz
 Natalia Giraldo as Rosalba Vargas
 Constanza Gutiérrez as Doña Zenaida
 Alejandra Lara as Nena Quintero
 Carolina Vivas as Mireya de Díaz Gaitán
 Margarita Reyes as Milena "La Guari"
 Karen Sierra González as Doris
 Juan Carlos Messier as Victor Prieto
 Kathy Sáenz as Patricia Valencia
 Santiago Gómez as Wilson Prieto
 Gabriel Piñeres as Lucho Díaz (boy)
 Andrés Castañeda as Lucho Díaz (young)
 Isabella Sierra as Gloria Vargas (girl)
 Katherine Escobar Farfán as Gloria Vargas (young)
 María Irene Toro as Mireya de Díaz Gaitán (adult)
 Catherine Mira as Rosalba Vargas (adult)
 Erick Rodríguez as Rubén Murcia (young)
 Morris Bravo as Arnoldo Suárez
 Laureano Sanchez as Jaime Monroy (el perito)
 Alden Rojas as Gonzalo Díaz (adult)
 Paola Benjumea as Zenaida Blanco (adult)
 María Camila Porras as Milena "La Guari" (young)
 Andrés Felipe Torres as Fredy Velandia
 David Guerrero as Triviño
 Liliana Escobar Noriega as Yolanda
 Daniel Rengifo as Brayan
 Oscar Salazar as Hector
 Orlando Valenzuela as Pote Gómez
 ‘Kiko’ Rubiano as Bonilla
 Pedro Mogollón as Ernesto Salazar
 Felipe Arcila as José
 Walter Luengas as Dr. Faldiño

References

External links 
 

2019 telenovelas
Colombian telenovelas
2019 Colombian television series debuts
2019 Colombian television series endings
Caracol Televisión telenovelas
Spanish-language telenovelas
Sony Pictures Television telenovelas
Television series by Teleset
Television shows set in Bogotá